Cédric Pascal Gasser (born 16 February 1998) is a Swiss footballer who plays as a defender for FC Vaduz in the Swiss Challenge League

Club career

FC St. Gallen

2017–2018 season 
Having played for St. Gallen's, youth teams for several years, Gasser was first named for a senior team squad on 30 November 2017, where he was an unused substitute in a Swiss Cup match against Young Boys

Gasser made his professional debut for St. Gallen in a 3-0 Swiss Super League win over FC Lugano on 25 February 2018 as an 87th minute substitute. He made 7 league appearances this season, only starting 2 matches: a 2:3 loss to FC Luzern and a 0:3 loss to FC Lausanne

2018-2019 Season: Loan to FC Wil 
On 30 June 2018, Gasser was sent on a 1-season loan to FC Wil of the Swiss Challenge League. He made his debut on 3 August 2018 in a 2:1 win over Servette FC as a 93rd minute substitute After only making 5 appearances between August and the end of December, Gasser established himself as a first team regular in the following months, making 13 appearances from February to May. He finished the season with 17 league appearances for FC Wil, helping them to a 5th-placed finish.

FC Vaduz

2019–2020 season 
On 22 May 2019, it was confirmed that Gasser would be joining FC Vaduz on a free transfer once his contract with St. Gallen expired on 30 June.  He made his Vaduz debut on 11 July in a 0:0 draw against Icelandic side Breiðablik in a Europa League 1st qualifying round match

International career

Switzerland U20 
Gasser made his under-20 debut on 10 September 2018, in a 1:0 win over Poland U20s. He made 4 further appearances for the U20s in October and November 2018, however he has not been included in any subsequent squads

References

External links
 FCSG Profile
 Kicker Profile
 SFL Profile
 Soccerway Profile
FC Vaduz Profile

Living people
1998 births
Swiss men's footballers
Swiss Super League players
FC St. Gallen players
Association football defenders
FC Wil players
FC Vaduz players
Swiss expatriate footballers
Swiss expatriate sportspeople in Liechtenstein
Expatriate footballers in Liechtenstein